Jean Antoine Armand Vergeaud (3 August 1876, Angoulême - 1949, Tunis?) was a French Orientalist painter.

Biography
He studied at the École nationale supérieure des beaux-arts, under Gustave Moreau, Fernand Cormon and François Flameng. 

In 1912, he moved to Tunis. He was named Director of the Institut Supérieur des Beaux-Arts de Tunis in 1927, a position he held until his death. Among his notable students there, one may mention , Yahia Turki, Abdelaziz Gorgi and Antonio Corpora.

He sent most of his works to be exhibited at the Salon des Artistes Français in Paris.

In 1932, he was named a Knight in the Legion of Honor.

He was married to Eva Peyronnet, daughter of the sculptor, Émile Peyronnet (1872-1956), who was also from Angoulême.

References 

 Béatrice Rolin, Armand Vergeaud (1876-1949): parcours d'un peintre entre tradition et modernité, Germa, 1997

External links 

 Biographical notes @ "Peintres Orientalistes Français"

1876 births
1949 deaths
19th-century French painters
French orientalists
French emigrants to Tunisia
People from Angoulême
20th-century French painters